The Treaty of Traverse des Sioux was signed on July 23, 1851, at Traverse des Sioux in Minnesota Territory between the United States government and the Upper Dakota Sioux bands. In this land cession treaty, the Sisseton and Wahpeton Dakota bands sold 21 million acres of land in present-day Iowa, Minnesota and South Dakota to the U.S. for $1,665,000.

The treaty was instigated by Alexander Ramsey, the first governor of Minnesota Territory, and Luke Lea, Commissioner of Indian Affairs in Washington, D.C. They were assisted by territorial Congressional delegate Henry Hastings Sibley and the traders who sought compensation for business losses which appeared on their books as "Indian debts."

Governor Ramsey and Commissioner Lea justified the Treaty of Traverse des Sioux and the Treaty of Mendota to the United States Congress on the basis of an "overwhelming tide of migration...increasing and irresistible in its westward progress." In reality, they were responding to pressures from land speculators who sought to divert migration to Minnesota from the newly formed states of Iowa and Wisconsin.

Background 
In the fall of 1849, Governor Alexander Ramsey had tried and failed to purchase land from the Dakota. Ramsey had initially offered less than three cents per acre – an offer that failed to gain much interest among Dakota leaders – and was largely ignored.

Past treaty payments to fur traders had already become a national scandal. An act of the United States Congress passed on March 3, 1847 prohibited annuities, money and goods to be paid to anyone other than heads of families or individuals in all future treaties. Nevertheless, Henry Hastings Sibley was determined to collect compensation for the traders.

Sibley informed Governor Ramsey that he would withhold his support for future land cession treaties, if the Dakota were not "allowed" to pay off their "past debts." Ramsey came to appreciate that Sibley and other traders wielded significant influence among the Dakota, and that he was more likely to succeed with their help.

By 1850, Ramsey and Sibley had arrived at an understanding. Governor Ramsey agreed to raise his offer from 2 1/2 cents to 10 cents per acre, and agreed to find a way of securing funds for the traders and their "mixed-blood" clerks and kin. Sibley also encouraged Ramsey to replace the previous treaty commissioner, former Iowa Territory Governor John Chambers, with another commissioner less likely to oppose these measures.

Sibley proceeded to build support for a new treaty. To win over the Dakotas, he directed his traders to go back to awarding credit and giving gifts liberally to reinforce their kinship ties, even if they resulted in short-term losses. To win over the mixed-blood community, he promised to lobby for the sale of the "half-breed tract" along Lake Pepin, granted to them in the 1830 Treaty of Prairie du Chien. The land had remained largely unoccupied, but it was communally owned and they lacked the right to sell it.

To win over the missionaries, Sibley emphasized how a massive sale of land would make it impossible for the Dakota to hunt and force them into farming. By replacing their communal lands with individually owned farm plots, the Dakota would become more "civilized" and more open to embracing Christianity.

On the advice of trader Martin McLeod, Sibley decided to treat with the Upper Dakota bands – the Sisseton and Wahpetons – first. McLeod reported that after a succession of bad winters, the western bands had suffered from hunger, often bordering on starvation, and were desperate for relief. In fact, he was confident that "they would sign almost anything." Once the Upper Dakota had signed a treaty, they reasoned, the Mdewakantons and Wahpekutes would surely follow.

Former fur trader Joseph R. Brown recruited his mixed-blood brother-in-law, Gabriel Renville (Tiwakan), to help build support for the treaty among Sisseton and Wahpeton leaders. Historian Gary Clayton Anderson writes, "Given the circumstances, Renville, in working with Brown, obviously assumed that he was helping his people out of what had become an increasingly unsustainable lifestyle."

Negotiations 
At 5:30 am on June 29, 1851, the treaty commissioners left Fort Snelling on board the steamboat Excelsior, traveling with a large group including newspaper reporters, as well as traders and "mixed-blood" assistants associated with Henry Hastings Sibley. They arrived at Traverse des Sioux before noon the following day.

The Wahpeton and Sisseton bands of the Upper Dakota (sometimes spelled Dahkotah on treaties) were hesitant to sign away so much land, but older members of the tribes believed that the results of the 1825 First Treaty of Prairie du Chien and the Black Hawk War limited their choices.

Treaty 

The Wahpeton and Sisseton bands ceded their lands in southern and western Minnesota Territory, along with some lands in Iowa and Dakota Territory. In exchange, the United States promised payment of $1,665,000 in cash and annuities.

The US paid the Dakota an annuity the equivalent of 7.5 cents an acre and charged settlers $1.25 an acre.

Later the government declared these were intended to be temporary, in an effort to force the Sioux out of Minnesota.

The Upper Sioux were not satisfied with their reservation because of low food supplies, but as it included several of their old villages, they agreed to stay. The Lower Sioux were displaced from their traditional woodlands, and were dissatisfied with their new territory of mostly prairie.

The Sioux also resented the separate "trader's paper" that was included in the treaty, as it paid $400,000 of the promised treaty annuity total to fur traders and mixed-bloods who had financial claims against the tribes. Traders' papers were documents that contained the names of traders, included in the aforesaid claims, who were due fees from previous trades. It said that they were allowed to take in land currency what may have been owed them out of the Dakotas' treaty payments. The Dakota agreed to sign the treaty but also requested a copy. Upon signing the copy, they were asked to sign a third paper which they believed to be a third copy. The Dakota were tricked into signing these "trader's papers", as the interpreters had not accurately told them what the document meant.

Aftermath 
Despite these issues, the crush of settlers moving into the area meant more Anglo European people encroaching on Sioux land.  As the US had promised increased annuity payments in exchange for more land cessions, Sioux leaders went to Washington, D.C. in 1858 to sign another pair of treaties; these ceded the reservation north of the Minnesota River.

The US intended the treaties to encourage the Sioux to convert from being nomadic hunters gathers to Anglo European farming, offering them compensation in the transition.  The forced change in lifestyle and the much lower than expected payments from the federal government caused economic suffering and increased social tensions within the tribes. Tensions erupted in the Dakota War of 1862.

Terms 

The preamble begins with,

The abbreviated terms of the treaty were:

1. Peace and friendship shall be perpetual
2. Land to cede
3. Stricken out by U.S. Senate.
4. Payments and other payments held in trust.
5. Laws against liquors in Indian country.
6. Rules and regulations to protect the rights of persons and property among the Indians.

Signers included Sleepy Eye, of the Sisseton Sioux.

See also 
 List of treaties

References

Further reading

External links 
 Treaty with the Sioux—Sisseton and Wahpeton Bands, 1851.  Treaty as ratified (i.e., with Section 3 stricken).  Archived copy of University of Oklahoma reproduction of relevant pages of Indian Affairs: Laws and Treaties, Volume II, Charles J. Kappler (ed.). Washington: Government Printing Office, 1904.
 The treaty of Traverse des Sioux in 1851 : under Governor Alexander Ramsey, with notes of the former treaty there, in 1841, under Governor James D. Doty, of Wisconsin. Library of Congress.  Contemporary description of background and signing of treaty.

Dakota War of 1862
United States and Native American treaties
1851 treaties
Native American history of Minnesota
Pre-statehood history of Minnesota
1851 in the United States
Minnesota Territory
Sioux
July 1851 events
1851 in Minnesota Territory